Boulder Crescent Place Historic District is a historic area in Colorado Springs, Colorado along West Boulder and Cascade Avenue near the intersection of the two streets. It is a National Register of Historic Places listing and is on the Colorado State Register of Historic Properties.

Overview
Five houses in the district are examples of Dutch Colonial Revival and Queen Anne style architecture in the United States built in Colorado Springs between 1894 and 1901. The city grew dramatically when people came to the Pikes Peak region at the turn-of-the-century "for their health and to enjoy the natural scenic beauty." The Boulder Crescent Place area is located near Memorial Valley Park and the streets are lined with trees planted when the homes were developed at the turn of the 20th century.

History
The Boulder - Cascade block was laid out in 1883.  It was conveniently located near the downtown business district, the railroad station and Monument Valley Park. The district is significant for its architectural charm, retention of its original appearance and residential use, setting along the wide, tree-line Cascade Avenue and proximity to the park.

The homes at 312 and 320 N. Cascade were built on land as subdivided in 1883. After the land was subdivided into smaller lots in 1898, the other three houses in the district were soon built in close proximity to one another. Although originally intended as quality single-family residences, some of the buildings became boarding houses for the large number of tourists or infirm who came to Colorado.

Houses

References

Colorado State Register of Historic Properties
Geography of Colorado Springs, Colorado
Buildings and structures in Colorado Springs, Colorado
Historic districts on the National Register of Historic Places in Colorado
National Register of Historic Places in Colorado Springs, Colorado